The 2021–22 season is the fourth season in Rajasthan United FC's existence, and their 1st season in I-League.

First Team Squad

Transfers and Loans

Loans Out

Current Technical Staff

Preseason

Competition

I-League 2nd Division

I-League

League table

Squad statistics

References 

2021–22 I-League by team
Rajasthan United FC seasons